Watusi or Watusis may refer to one of the following:

 Tutsi, an African ethnic group
 Watusi (album), 1994 studio album by The Wedding Present
 Watusi (dance), a solo dance from the early 1960s
 Watusi (film), a 1959 film with George Montgomery and Taina Elg
 Watusi (firework), a type of firecracker
 Watusi cattle, a modern American breed of domestic cattle.

See also
 Ankole-Watusi, a cattle breed